In architecture, the term xystum refers to a wall, promenade, alley, or open path. It can also refer to an atrium, ambulacrum, or parvis in front of a basilica. The term should not be confused with the ancient Greek architectural term xystus, meaning the covered portico of a gymnasium.

Sources

Architectural elements